The Kuwait women's national basketball team is the basketball side that represents Kuwait in international competitions. It is administered by the Kuwait Basketball Association.

The team appeared at the 2011 Pan Arab Games.

See also
 Kuwait women's national under-19 basketball team

References

External links
 Official website of the Kuwait Basketball Association
 Kuwait National Team - Women Presentation at Asia-basket.com
 Kuwait Basketball Records at FIBA Archive

Women's national basketball teams
Basketball in Kuwait
Basketball teams in Kuwait
Basketball